Michael Meltsner (born 1937) is an American lawyer, the George J. and Kathleen Waters Matthews distinguished University Professor of law (and former dean) at Northeastern University School of Law and author. Meltsner was educated at Oberlin College and the Yale Law School.

As first assistant counsel to the NAACP Legal Defense and Educational Fund he served as counsel in many   leading civil rights cases of the 1960s, including those that led to the integration of Southern hospitals and medical facilities, and a moratorium on capital punishment. He represented Mohammad Ali in the litigation that enabled his return to the boxing ring.

Meltsner sits on the board of the Legal Action Center. He is a winner of many awards including a Berlin American Academy prize Fellowship, a Guggenheim Fellowship, the Hugo Bedau Award for capital punishment scholarship and an American Bar Association Silver Gabel media award. In 2012 John Jay College (CUNY) conferred an Honorary Doctor of Laws calling him "the principal architect of the death penalty abolition movement in the United States."

Selected publications 
Philip G Schrag and Michael Meltsner, Reflections on Clinical Education, Northeastern University Press, 1998, 
Cruel and Unusual: The Supreme Court and Capital Punishment, (Quid Pro Books Section Edition, 2011) 
The Making of a Civil Rights Lawyer, University of Virginia Press, 2006, 
In Our Name: A Play of the Torture Years, Norwood Press, 2010
Short Takes, A Novel, Random House, 1979Race Rape and Injustice, University of Tennessee Press, 2012

References

External links 
 Gallery
 Article
 Snowden Article
 Papers
 Article

American lawyers
1937 births
Living people
Northeastern University faculty